Riverside School is a historic school building located at Elkins, Randolph County, West Virginia.  It was built between 1902 and 1905, as a one-story, rectangular red brick structure, measuring 56 feet, 6 inches, by 34 feet.  A second story was added in 1928, when it became a four-year high school.  It has a hipped roof and a sandstone foundation.  It was originally built as a school for African American students, and remained so until the 1954 desegregation order and  the school was closed.

It was listed on the National Register of Historic Places in 2009.

References

African-American historic places
School buildings on the National Register of Historic Places in West Virginia
Neoclassical architecture in West Virginia
School buildings completed in 1905
Buildings and structures in Elkins, West Virginia
National Register of Historic Places in Randolph County, West Virginia
Defunct schools in West Virginia
Former school buildings in the United States
1905 establishments in West Virginia